Blue Seal Ice Cream  is a Japanese ice cream chain operated by Foremost Blue Seal. It is particularly prevalent in Okinawa, and its slogan is "Born in America, Raised in Okinawa."

History
The United States military created the ice cream for American soldiers stationed in Okinawa after the close of World War II, to boost morale and give them a familiar taste of home. Its first factory opened in 1948 on a US base. The Blue Seal products were only offered to Americans until 1963, when the company began selling to the Okinawan public. Their flagship store in Naha also opened that year. 

Later on, the company transferred to local ownership and Okinawan flavors such as beni-imo (purple sweet potato) and Goya bitter melon were introduced. The flagship store has a retro American diner theme.

In 2009, Blue Seal opened a location in Shibuya, Tokyo, marking its first expansion onto Kanto.

References

External links

Okinawan cuisine
Ice cream parlors
Japanese companies established in 1948
Restaurants established in 1948